Wallendorf (Eifel) is a municipality in the German state of Rhineland-Palatinate, on the Sauer river.

Wallendorf was first mentioned in an old document from 1136 as "Vualcheresdorf". It is located on the German side of a bridge connecting it to the Luxembourgish town of Wallendorf-Pont. The bridge was of strategic importance during the Battle of the Bulge in World War II.

References

Germany–Luxembourg border crossings
Bitburg-Prüm